Kolkwitz Süd station is a railway station in the southern part of the municipality of Kolkwitz, located in the Spree-Neiße district in Brandenburg, Germany.

References

Railway stations in Brandenburg
Buildings and structures in Spree-Neiße
Railway stations in Germany opened in 1914